Viray is a surname. Notable people with the surname include:
Bianca Viray, American mathematician
Jim Bruce Viray, Filipino basketball player
Kirst Viray, Filipino model and television actor in Ang sa Iyo ay Akin
Jona Viray (born 1989), Filipino singer and actress
Pat Viray (born 1985), American soccer player
Primitivo Viray, Filipino economist and academic administrator